Pleurobema avellanum, the hazel pigtoe, was a species of freshwater mussel, an aquatic bivalve mollusk in the family Unionidae, the river mussels.

This species was endemic to the United States. It is now extinct.

References

avellanum
Molluscs described in 1900
Taxonomy articles created by Polbot